The Mystery of the Express Car (Spanish: El misterio del carro express) is a 1953 Mexican mystery film directed by Zacarías Gómez Urquiza.

Cast

References

Bibliography 
 María Luisa Amador. Cartelera cinematográfica, 1950-1959. UNAM, 1985.

External links 
 

1953 films
1950s mystery films
Mexican mystery films
1950s Spanish-language films
Films directed by Zacarías Gómez Urquiza
Mexican black-and-white films
1950s Mexican films